The Mocoretá River (Spanish, Río Mocoretá) is a river in the Mesopotamic northeastern region of Argentina. It is born in the southeast of the province of Corrientes, south of Curuzú Cuatiá. It flows south, first turning east and then west until reaching the interprovincial border with Entre Ríos, where it receives the Las Tunas Stream. It turns southeast again along the border, passes by the town of Mocoretá, and empties into the Uruguay River, into the southern part of the Salto Grande reservoir.

References

 Secretaría de Minería de la Nación. Provincia de Entre Ríos - Recursos hídricos.

Rivers of Argentina
Tributaries of the Uruguay River
Rivers of Corrientes Province
Rivers of Entre Ríos Province